Princess Hilda of Luxembourg (15 February 1897, Berg Castle, Colmar-Berg, Luxembourg –  8 September 1979, Berg Castle, Colmar-Berg, Luxembourg) was a Princess of Luxembourg by birth and the Princess of Schwarzenberg by marriage.

Early life
Hilda was the third daughter of William IV, Grand Duke of Luxembourg, and his wife, Infanta Marie Anne of Portugal. Her two eldest sisters reigned as sovereign Grand Duchess of Luxembourg and titular Duchess of Nassau: Marie-Adélaïde and Charlotte.

Marriage 
Princess Hilda married with Adolf, 10th Prince of Schwarzenberg (Frauenberg, 18 August 1890 – Bordighera, 27 February 1950) in Berg Castle on 29 October 1930. The couple shared a passion for agriculture, wildlife and botany and spent much of their time at their Stará Obora hunting lodge near Hluboká. 
They acquired Mpala Farm in Laikipia, Kenya, in 1933. Apart from bringing modern farming methods to the estate, Princess Hilda's husband built a hydroelectric power station there (some of the machinery was imported from his native Hluboká) and made exceptional improvements to his workers' living conditions. He inherited the family estates after his father's death in 1938. They did not have children.

Titles
15 February 1897 – 29 October 1930: Her Grand Ducal Highness Princess Hilda of Luxembourg, Princess of Nassau
29 October 1930 – 1 October 1938: Her Grand Ducal Highness The Hereditary Princess of Schwarzenberg, Princess of Luxembourg and Nassau
1 October 1938 – 27 February 1950: Her Grand Ducal Highness The Princess of Schwarzenberg, Princess of Luxembourg and Nassau
27 February 1950 – 8 September 1979: Her Grand Ducal Highness The Dowager Princess of Schwarzenberg, Princess of Luxembourg and Nassau

Ancestry

References

Bibliography
 Généalogie des rois et des princes de Jean-Charles Volkmann Edit. Jean-Paul Giserot (1998)

1897 births
1979 deaths
House of Nassau-Weilburg
Schwarzenberg family
Luxembourgian princesses
Dames of the Order of Saint Isabel
Daughters of monarchs